The Conspiracy is a studio mixtape by the New York hip hop supergroup the Weathermen. It was released July 3, 2003 on Eastern Conference Records.

Music 
A large portion of the mixtape is produced respectively by Camu Tao, RJD2, Przm and Johnny Dangerous, with the rest being instrumentals used by other well known hip hop artists such as Nas, Redman and Notorious B.I.G., among others.

Track listing

References

External links 
 The Conspiracy at Discogs

2003 mixtape albums
Debut mixtape albums
Eastern Conference Records albums
Albums produced by RJD2
El-P albums